Van der Sluijs is a Dutch surname. Meaning "from the locks / sluice" it could have a toponymic origin or could be a metonymic occupational surname (the lock keeper). Alternative spellings are Van der Sluys and Van der Sluis, while some or all compounds can be concatenated and capitalized outside the Netherlands. Notable people with the surname include:

Van der Sluijs
Dannij van der Sluijs (born 1963), Dutch politician
Dingeman van der Sluijs (born 1947), known as Dick Diamonde, Dutch-Australian musician
Ferenc E. van der Sluijs (born 1970s), stage name I-F, Dutch DJ
Teunkie van der Sluijs (born 1981), Dutch theatre director working in the UK as Teunkie Van Der Sluijs

Van der Sluis
 Jan van der Sluis (1889–1952), Dutch footballer 
 Mary Meyer-van der Sluis (1917–1994), Dutch fencer

Van der Sluys
Cornelis van der Sluys (1883–1944), Dutch artist and designer
Dean van der Sluys (born 1995), Dutch footballer
Harry van der Sluys (1891–1954), known as Roy Rene, Australian comedian
Stan Vandersluys (1924–2005), Australian rules footballer
Wilhelm van der Sluys (born 1991), South African rugby union player

References

Dutch-language surnames
Occupational surnames
Dutch toponymic surnames